Olli Reikko (10 January 1927 – 23 June 2005) was a Finnish athlete. He competed in the men's decathlon at the 1952 Summer Olympics.

References

1927 births
2005 deaths
Athletes (track and field) at the 1952 Summer Olympics
Finnish decathletes
Olympic athletes of Finland
Sportspeople from Pori